The Andrej Bagar Theatre is a theatre located in Nitra, Slovakia. It opened in 1949. Various productions from the theatre have been recognised in the annual DOSKY Awards.

References

External links 
  

Theatres in Slovakia
Buildings and structures in Nitra